Baroness Suzanne Lilar (née Suzanne Verbist; 21 May 1901 – 11 December 1992) was a Flemish Belgian essayist, novelist, and playwright writing in French. She was the wife of the Belgian Minister of Justice Albert Lilar and mother of the writer Françoise Mallet-Joris and the art historian Marie Fredericq-Lilar.

She was a member of the Royal Academy of French Language and Literature from 1952 to 1992.

Life

Lilar's mother was a middle school teacher, her father a railway station master.  After having lived her youth in Ghent, and following a brief first marriage, she moved to Antwerp, where she became the first woman lawyer, and where in 1929 she married the lawyer Albert Lilar who would later become a Minister of Justice and Minister of State (Liberal Party).  She was the mother of the writer Françoise Mallet-Joris (born 1930) and the 18th-century art historian Marie Fredericq-Lilar (born 1934).  After the death of her husband in 1976, she left Antwerp and relocated to Brussels in 1977.

Education

In 1919 Lilar attended the State University of Ghent, where she studied philosophy and was the first woman to receive a law degree in 1925.  During her studies she attended a seminar on Hadewych.  Her interest in the 13th century poet and mystic would play an important role in her later essays, plays and novels.  Lilar's historico-cultural insight, her analysis of consciousness and emotion, her search for beauty and love are at the same time current and timeless.

Literary career
Applying a strong intellect to her work through precise language, she was a thoroughly modern writer and feminist who nonetheless remained highly versed in many areas of traditional western thought (Encyclopædia Britannica).  In 1956 Lilar succeeds Gustave Van Zype as member of the Royal Academy of French Language and Literature.  Her oeuvre has been translated in numerous languages.

Early work
Lilar began her literary career as a journalist, reporting on Republican Spain for the newspaper L'Indépendance belge in 1931.  She later became a playwright with Le Burlador (1946), an original reinterpretation of the myth of Don Juan from the female perspective that revealed a profound capacity for psychological analysis.  She wrote two more plays, Tous les chemins mènent au ciel (1947), a theological drama set in a 14th-century convent, and Le Roi lépreux (1951), a neo-Pirandellian play about the Crusades.

Critical essays
Her earliest essays are on the subject of the theatre. Soixante ans de théâtre belge (1952), originally published in New York City in 1950 as The Belgian Theater since 1890, emphasizes the importance of a Flemish tradition.  She followed this with Journal de l'analogiste (1954), in which the origin of the experience of beauty and poetry was guided by a path of analogies.  A short essay Théâtre et mythomanie was published in 1958.  Transcendence and metamorphosis are central to her seminal work Le Couple (1963), translated in 1965 by Jonathan Griffin as Aspects of Love in Western Society.  In writings on Rubens, the Androgyne or homosexuality in Ancient Greece, Lilar meditates on the role of the woman in conjugal love throughout the ages.  Translated into Dutch in 1976, it includes an afterword by Marnix Gijsen.  In the same vein she later wrote critical essays on Jean-Paul Sartre (À propos de Sartre et de l'amour, 1967) and Simone de Beauvoir (Le Malentendu du Deuxième Sexe, 1969).

Autobiographical works, novels
Lilar wrote two autobiographical books, Une Enfance gantoise (1976) and À la recherche d'une enfance (1979), and two novels, both of which date from 1960, Le Divertissement portugais and La Confession anonyme, a neoplatonic idealization of love filtered through personal experience.  The Belgian director André Delvaux recreated this novel on film as Benvenuta in 1983, transposed as an intense examination of a tortured but exalted relationship between a young Belgian woman and her Italian lover. Les Moments merveilleux and Journal en partie double, I & II were published as part of  Cahiers Suzanne Lilar (1986).

Select bibliography
 Le Burlador (1945), Brussels, Éditions des Artistes. Portrait of Author by artist Albert Crommelynck.
 Tous les chemins mènent au ciel (1947), Brussels, Éditions des Artistes; Reedited 1989, Brussels, Les Éperonniers.
 Le Roi lépreux (1951), Brussels, Les Éditions Lumière.
 The Belgian Theatre since 1890 (1950), New York, Belgian Government Information Center, 67 pp.
 Soixante ans de théâtre belge (1952).
 Journal de l'analogiste (1954), Paris, Éditions Julliard; Reedited 1979, Paris, Grasset. Foreword by Julien Gracq, Introduction by Jean Tordeur.
 Le Jeu (1957), Editions Synthèses, nr. 128: 218–239, Woluwe-St.Lambert, Bruxelles.
 Théâtre et mythomanie (1958), Porto.
 La confession anonyme (1960), Paris, Éditions Julliard; Reedited 1980, Brussels, Éditions Jacques Antoine, with foreword by the author; 1983, Paris, Gallimard, .  The Belgian film director André Delvaux adapted this novel in his film Benvenuta in 1983.
 Le Divertissement portugais (1960), Paris, Éditions Julliard; Reedited 1990, Brussels, Labor, Espace Nord, .
 Le Couple in La Nef, n.s. no. 5, La Française Aujourd'hui,  La femme et l'Amour, pp. 33–45.
 Le Couple (1963), Paris, Grasset; Reedited 1970, Bernard Grasset Coll. Diamant, 1972, Livre de Poche; 1982, Brussels, Les Éperonniers, ; Translated as Aspects of Love in Western Society in 1965, by and with a foreword by Jonathan Griffin, New York, McGraw-Hill, LC 65-19851.
 A propos de Sartre et de l'amour (1967), Paris, Éditions Bernard Grasset; Reedited 1984, Gallimard, .
 Le Malentendu du Deuxième Sexe (1969), with collaboration of Prof. Gilbert-Dreyfus. Paris, University Presses of France (Presses Universitaires de France).
 Une enfance gantoise (1976).  Paris, Grassset, ; Reedited 1986, Bibliothèque Marabout.
 A la recherche d'une enfance (1979).  Foreword by Jean Tordeur.  Brussels, Éditions Jacques Antoine, with original photos by the author's father.
 Faire un film avec André Delvaux (1982), pp. 209–214. In André Delvaux ou les visages de l'imaginaire, Ed. A. Nysenhole, Revue de l'Université de Bruxelles.
 Journal en partie double (1986) in Cahiers Suzanne Lilar, Paris, Gallimard, .
 Les Moments merveilleux (1986) in Cahiers Suzanne Lilar, Paris, Gallimard, .

Literary awards
 Le Burlador, 1946. Prix Picard; 1947. Prix Vaxelaire;
 Journal de l'Analogiste. 1954. Prix Sainte-Beuve;
 Le Couple. 1963. Prix Ève Delacroix;
 1972. Prix quinquennal de la critique de de l'essai, l'Académie française;
 1973. Prix Belgo-Canadien for her oeuvre;
 1977. Une enfance gantoise.  Prix Saint-Simon;
 1980. Prix Europalia for her oeuvre;
 1982. A Colloquium on the oeuvre of Suzanne Lilar was organized by Henri Ronse, Director of the "Nouveau Théåtre" in Brussels.  Participants included Elisabeth Badinter, Annie Cohen-Solal, Françoise Mallet-Joris, Hector Bianciotti, Jean Tordeur, André Delvaux, and Jacques de Decker, and their essays were published in 1986 in the  "Cahiers Suzanne Lilar".

Select critical works
 Autour de Suzanne Lilar.  Texts of Georges Sion, Françoise Mallet-Joris, Julien Gracq, R.P. Carré, Roland Mortier, Armand Lanoux, Jacques de Decker, Jean Tordeur, Suzanne Lilar.  Bulletin de l'Académie Royale de Langue et de Littérature françaises.  Brussels, 1978, t. LVI, nr. 2, pp. 165–204.
 Alphabet des Lettres belges de langue française.  Brussels, Association pour la promotion des Lettres belges de langue française, 1982.
 René Micha, 1982. <<Benvenuta>> d'André Delvaux: Une adaptation exemplaire de la <<Confession anonyme>> de Suzanne Lilar, pp. 215–219. In André Delvaux ou les visages de l'imaginaire, Ed. A. Nysenhole, Revue de l'Université de Bruxelles.
 Cahiers Suzanne Lilar.  Paris, Gallimard, 1986 (with a bibliography by Martine Gilmont).
 Marc Quaghebeur, 1990,  Lettres belges: entre absence et magie.  Brussels, Labor, Archives du Futur.
 Paul Renard, 1991.   Suzanne Lilar: Bio-Bibliographie, vol. 17, pp. 1–6 in Nord – Revue de Critique et de Création Littéraires du Nord/ Pas-de-Calais. Suzanne Lilar- Françoise Mallet-Joris, .
 Béatrice Gaben-Shults, 1991.   Le Théåtre de Suzanne Lilar: tentation et refus de mysticisme, vol. 17, pp. 7–13, in Nord – Revue de Critique et de Création Littéraires du Nord/ Pas-de-Calais. Suzanne Lilar – Françoise Mallet-Joris, .
 Colette Nys-Mazure, 1991. La part du feu , vol. 17, pp. 15–22, in Nord – Revue de Critique et de Création Littéraires du Nord/ Pas-de-Calais. Suzanne Lilar – Françoise Mallet-Joris, .
 Colette Nys-Mazure, 1991. Dossiers Suzanne Lilar, dans Dossiers Littérature Française de Belgique (Service du Livre Luxembourgeois) fasc. 3(32): 1–27. 
 Michèle Hecquet, 1991. L'Éducation paternelle: Une enfance gantoise, vol. 17, pp. 23–28, in Nord – Revue de Critique et de Création Littéraires du Nord/ Pas-de-Calais. Suzanne Lilar – Françoise Mallet-Joris, .
Katharina M. Wilson, 1991, Suzanne Lilar in: An Encyclopedia of Continental Women Writers, Volume two: L-Z, p. 730 (entry by Donald Friedman), Taylor & Francis, 
 Colette Nys-Mazure, 1992, Suzanne Lilar.  Editions Labor, Brussels, 150 pp., .
 Frans Amelinckx, 1995, L'apport de John Donne à l'œuvre de S. Lilar, pp. 259–270 in La Belgique telle qu'elle s'écrit.
 Françoise Mallet-Joris, Portrait of author; Colette Nys-Masure, foreword of Suzanne Lilar – Théåtre, 1999, Collection Poésie Théåtre Roman, Académie Royale de Langue de de Littérature Françaises, 
 Suzanne Fredericq, 2001, 'Elegance: A Brief, Perfectly Balanced Instant of Complete Possession of Forms", pp. 14–19 In Elegance, Beauty and Truth", Ed. Lewis Pyenson, New Series Vol. 2, Center for Louisiana Studies, Univ. of Louisiana at Lafayette, 
 Susan Bainbrigge, 2004, Writing about the In-Between in Suzanne Lilar's Une Enfance gantoise, Forum for Modern Language Studies 40(3):301–313.
 Hélène Rouch, 2001–2002, Trois conceptions du sexe: Simone de Beauvoir entre Adrienne Sahuqué et Suzanne Lilar, Simone de Beauvoir Studies, n° 18, pp. 49–60.

Interview
 Une enfance gantoise – Une interview de Madame Suzanne Lilar In Le Rail, 1977(2): 23–27

References

External links

Académie Royale de Langues et de Littératures Belges
Voice of Suzanne Lilar
The Theatre of Suzane Lilar
Writing about the In-Between in Suzanne Lilar's Une Enfance gantoise by Susan Bainbrigge
Suzanne Lilar in Encyclopædia Britannica
Suzanne Lilar in An Encyclopedia of Continental Women Writers, Ed. by Katharina M. Wilson; entry by Donald Friedman, p. 730
Suzanne Lilar in Francophone Literatures:An Introductory Survey by Belinda Jack
Splitting the Difference: Dualisms in Persiles by Diana de Armas Wilson
Fiction and the Androgyne in the Works of Cervantes by Ruth El Saffar
Article on André Delvaux in La Libre Belgique
Virginia Woolf and Androgyny
L'espace privilégié de l'entre-deux dans l'oeuvre autobiographique de Suzanne Lilar, by Natalya Lenina, Les Cahiers du GRELCEF, 2010 (1): 141–1577
Famous Belgians
Let the Dames Begin by S.S. Fair, NYT Aug 26, 2007
Marguerite Yourcenar et Suzanne Lilar : plus qu'une rencontre, une complicité by Michèle Goslar
Discussion of Lilar's criticism of Simone de Beauvoir The Second Sex:New Interdisciplinary Essays by Ruth Evans, Editor
Maria Teodora Comsa, Le burlador de Suzanne Lilar: mythe et tragédie féminine, 2008, MS Thesis, San Jose State Univ., 112 pp.
Feminist Interpretations of Simone de Beauvoir by Margaret A. Simons
Raphaël Sorin on Don Juan
Raphaël Sorin on Simone de Beauvoir and Suzanne Lilar
Critique of "The Second Sex" in Spiegel Online
Suzanne Lilar in Encyclopædia Universalis
Benvenuta in André Delvaux by Henri Agel, Joseph Marty
 Interviews with Suzanne Lilar:, and other video clips
"Le Malentendu du 2ème sexe" by Suzanne Lilar: 1969 ORTF interview

1901 births
1992 deaths
20th-century Belgian novelists
20th-century Belgian philosophers
20th-century Belgian women writers
20th-century Belgian dramatists and playwrights
20th-century essayists
Barons of Belgium
Belgian autobiographers
Belgian essayists
Belgian literary critics
Belgian women literary critics
Belgian women essayists
Belgian women journalists
Belgian women novelists
Belgian women philosophers
Belgian writers in French
Belgian consciousness researchers and theorists
Critical theorists
Feminist writers
Flemish women writers
Flemish writers
Ghent University alumni
Writers from Antwerp
Writers from Ghent
Philosophers of art
Philosophers of history
Philosophers of literature
Philosophers of love
Philosophers of sexuality
Prix Sainte-Beuve winners
Belgian women dramatists and playwrights
20th-century Belgian journalists